Andreas Hadelöv (born July 23, 1975) is a Swedish professional ice hockey player currently with the Skellefteå AIK team in the Swedish Elitserien league.

Hadelöv holds the record for most Elitserien games played by a goaltender, 507 as of the end of the 2020–21 season. Stefan Liv was second with 387 games played.

External links

References 

1975 births
Swedish ice hockey goaltenders
Djurgårdens IF Hockey players
Malmö Redhawks players
Skellefteå AIK players
Living people